Masami Masuda, known professionally as Cusi Masuda, (born June 8, 1944) is a Japanese-American artist, sculptor and painter.

He attended Musashino Art University in Japan then worked on his sculptures shortly, taking part in Forma Viva 1970 before moving to New York City in 1970. After he had moved to New York City he participated in the 1981 Whitney Counterweight. He continues to make art in New York. He has been featured in multiple art publications including Artforum, Art in America, and Sulfur. He also has a minor role in the 2013 documentary, Cutie and the Boxer. His work Eternal performance for the 50th anniversary of Hiroshima is included in the Joan Flasch Artists' Book Collection at the School of the Art Institute of Chicago. Masuda's work was included in Out of Actions - Aktionismus, Body Art & Performance, 1949-1979 at the Museum of Applied Arts, Vienna in 1998

References 

1944 births
Living people
American artists of Japanese descent